People's Court Daily (Chinese: 人民法院报; Pinyin: Rénmín Fǎyuàn Bào) is a daily newspaper in China owned by the PRC Supreme People's Court. It was established on 1 October 1992, and is headquartered in Beijing.

References

External links
  

1992 establishments in China
Chinese-language newspapers (Simplified Chinese)
Chinese Communist Party newspapers
Newspapers published in Beijing
Publications established in 1992
Supreme People's Court
Daily newspapers published in China